Sergio Llull Melià (born 15 November 1987) is a Spanish professional basketball player and the team captain for Real Madrid of the Spanish Liga ACB and the EuroLeague.

Llull is a two−time All-EuroLeague Team selection, and was the EuroLeague MVP of the 2016–17 season. As a regular member of the senior Spain national team, he has won a FIBA World Cup title, three EuroBasket gold medals, as well as a bronze. He also won two Summer Olympics medals, a silver in 2012, and a bronze in 2016.

Professional career

Early years
Llull began his career playing for the La Salle Maò and CB i Unió Manresana junior clubs as a youth. He made his professional debut with the Spanish ACB League club Manresa during the 2005–06 season. He also played with the Spanish 4th Division club Finques Olesa that season, on loan. He returned to Manresa, and played in the Spanish 2nd Division in the next season.

Real Madrid
Llull joined the Spanish EuroLeague club Real Madrid in 2007. In 2009, Real Madrid exercised a club option to extend his contract for another 2 years. In 2010, Llull extended his contract with Real Madrid through the year 2014.

He was named the MVP of the final of the mid-season three game 2012 Spanish King's Cup tournament. Later that year, Llull extended his contract with Real Madrid once again, this time through the 2017–18 season.

In the 2014–15 season, Real Madrid won the EuroLeague championship, after defeating Olympiacos by a score of 78–59 in the 2015 EuroLeague Final. Real Madrid eventually finished the season by also winning the Spanish League championship, after a 3–0 series sweep in the Spanish League Finals series against Barcelona. By winning the Spanish League championship, Real Madrid won the triple crown. Llull was named the Spanish League Finals MVP of 2015.

In the Summer of 2015, Llull once again extended his contract with Real Madrid, this time through the 2020–21 season. The 6-year contract extension was at a per season salary of €2.7 million euros net income per season, and his contract included a record buyout option of €25 million euros (USD$28.64 million as of 3 February 2019 exchange rate), the highest buyout amount ever in European club basketball history.

Llull was named the EuroLeague MVP of the 2016–17 season. In May 2018, Real Madrid won the 2017–18 EuroLeague season championship, after defeating Fenerbahçe Doğuş in the final game, by a score of 85–80. Llull missed most of the season due to a torn ACL injury, only to come back into the team's rotation at the Final Four, where he helped his team to grab their second EuroLeague title in four seasons.

NBA draft rights
Llull was chosen by the Denver Nuggets with the 34th pick in the 2009 NBA draft. The Houston Rockets then bought his draft rights from the Nuggets for approximately $2.25 million, which at the time made him the most expensive player ever to be purchased during the draft's second round. On 27 November 2020 Llull's draft rights were traded to the New York Knicks.

National team career
As a member of the junior Spain national basketball teams, Llull won the gold medal at the 2004 FIBA Europe Under-18 Championship, and he won the silver medal at the 2007 FIBA Europe Under-20 Championship. He has also played with the senior men's Spain national basketball team.

Llull won the gold medal at the 2019 FIBA World Cup, three gold medals at the EuroBasket, in 2009, 2011, and 2015. He also won the silver medal at the 2012 Summer Olympics, the bronze medal at the EuroBasket 2013, and the bronze medal at the 2016 Summer Olympics. He also played at the 2010 FIBA World Championship, and at the 2014 FIBA World Cup.

Player profile
Early in his career, Llull was known for his straight line speed, jumping ability, and open court fast break dunks. Later in his career, he has been known for his long-distance 3 point shooting, and clutch shots. Llull averaged a PIR of 16.8 in the EuroLeague, during the 2016–17 season.

He can play at either the point guard or shooting guard position. He spent the early part of his club EuroLeague career playing as a shooting guard, and then switched to the point guard position later in his club career. In the senior men's Spain national team, he has mainly played at the shooting guard position.

Career statistics

|-
| style="text-align:left;"| 2007–08
| style="text-align:left;"| Real Madrid
| EuroLeague
| 15 || 8.1 || .370 || .000 || .789 || .4 || .9 || .2 || .1 || 2.3
|-
| style="text-align:left;"| 2008–09
| style="text-align:left;"| Real Madrid
| EuroLeague
| 19 || 19.0 || .468 || .380 || .926 || 1.1 || 2.2 || .5 || .2 || 6.9 
|-
| style="text-align:left;"| 2009–10
| style="text-align:left;"| Real Madrid
| EuroLeague
| 18 || 21.1 || .521 || .418 || .724 || 1.2 || 2.0 || 1.0 || .1 || 9.5 
|-
| style="text-align:left;"| 2010–11
| style="text-align:left;"| Real Madrid
| EuroLeague
| 23 || 28.0 || .401 || .343 || .841 || 2.3 || 3.0 || .8 || .1 || 11.9
|-
| style="text-align:left;"| 2011–12
| style="text-align:left;"| Real Madrid
| EuroLeague
| 16 || 22.2 || .427 || .295 || .719 || 1.5 || 3.2 || .6 || .0 || 7.4 
|-
| style="text-align:left;"| 2012–13
| style="text-align:left;"| Real Madrid
| EuroLeague
| 27 || 27.0 || .396 || .339 || .781 || 2.3 || 3.2 || .6 || .1 || 10.4 
|-
| style="text-align:left;"| 2013–14
| style="text-align:left;"| Real Madrid
| EuroLeague
| 31 || 29.1 || .466 || .338 || .796 || 1.8 || 4.1 || .6 || .0 || 11.4
|-
| style="text-align:left;"| 2014–15
| style="text-align:left;"| Real Madrid
| Liga ACB
| 42 || 24.7 || .457 || .363 || .864 || 1.8 || 3.3 || .8 || .1 || 12.0 
|-
| style="text-align:left;"| 2014–15
| style="text-align:left;"| Real Madrid
| EuroLeague
| 30 || 27.5 || .439 || .379 || .821 || 1.7 || 5.8 || .8 || .1 || 10.4 
|-
| style="text-align:left;"| 2015–16
| style="text-align:left;"| Real Madrid
| EuroLeague
| 24 || 27.8 || .378 || .350 || .807 || 1.8 || 4.6 || .7 || .2 || 12.8 
|-
| style="text-align:left;"| 2016–17
| style="text-align:left;"| Real Madrid
| Liga ACB
| 39 || 25.6 || .434 || .344 || .793 || 1.5 || 5.4 || .5 || .0 || 16.3 
|-
| style="text-align:left;"| 2016–17
| style="text-align:left;"| Real Madrid
| EuroLeague
| 33 || 27.8 || .416 || .330 || .847 || 1.8 || 5.9 || .7 || .1 || 16.5 
|-
| style="text-align:left;"| 2017–18
| style="text-align:left;"| Real Madrid
| EuroLeague
| 4 || 18.0 || .361 || .375 || .500 || .5 || 4.5 || .5 || .0 || 10.0 
|-
| style="text-align:left;"| 2018–19
| style="text-align:left;"| Real Madrid
| EuroLeague
| 27 || 21.4 || .358 || .321 || .958 || 2.0 || 4.0 || .4 || .0 || 10.5 
|-
| style="text-align:left;"| 2019–20
| style="text-align:left;"| Real Madrid
| EuroLeague
| 16 || 18.6 || .287 || .288 || .893 || 1.2 || 3.5 || .6 || .1 || 7.5 
|-
| style="text-align:left;"| 2020–21
| style="text-align:left;"| Real Madrid
| Liga ACB
| 28 || 16.0 || .371 || .328 || .784 || 1.6 || 2.3 || .4 || .0 || 8.9 
|-
| style="text-align:left;"| 2020–21
| style="text-align:left;"| Real Madrid
| EuroLeague
| 25 || 17.6 || .372 || .336 || .863 || 1.6 || 3.0 || .4 || .0 || 8.8 
|-class=sortbottom
| align="center" colspan=2 | Career
| All Leagues
| 417 || 23.4 || .414 || .343 || .824 || 1.7 || 3.8 || .6 || .1 || 11.0

Awards and accomplishments

Pro career
Liga ACB (Spanish League) champion (7×):
2007, 2013, 2015, 2016, 2018, 2019, 2022
Copa del Rey (Spanish Cup) winner (6×):
2012, 2014, 2015, 2016, 2017, 2020
Supercopa de España (Spanish Supercup) winner (7×):
2012, 2013, 2014, 2018, 2019, 2020, 2021
EuroLeague champion (2×):
2015, 2018
Triple Crown winner: 
2015
FIBA Intercontinental Cup champion: 
2015

Spanish junior national team
 2004 FIBA Europe Under-18 Championship: 
 2007 FIBA Europe Under-20 Championship:

Spanish senior national team
 EuroBasket 2009: 
 EuroBasket 2011: 
 2012 Summer Olympics:  Silver
 EuroBasket 2013: 
 EuroBasket 2015: 
 2016 Summer Olympics:  Bronze
 2019 FIBA World Championship:

Individual awards
8× All-EuroLeague Team:
 All-EuroLeague Second Team: 2011
 All-EuroLeague First Team: 2017
 1× All-Decade Euroleague team member
 2× Spanish ACB League MVP of the Month: February 2012, February 2016
 2× Spanish King's Cup MVP: 2012, 2017
 3× All-Spanish ACB League Team: 2012, 2015, 2017
 2× EuroLeague MVP of the Month: April 2013, November 2016
 3× Spanish Supercup MVP: 2014, 2018, 2021
 2× Spanish ACB League Finals MVP: 2015, 2016
 FIBA Intercontinental Cup MVP: 2015
 Spanish League MVP: 2017
 EuroLeague MVP: 2017

References

External links
 Sergio Llull at Liga ACB 
 
 Sergio Llull at EuroLeague
 
 Sergio Llull at FIBA Europe
 
 
 
  

1987 births
Living people
2010 FIBA World Championship players
2014 FIBA Basketball World Cup players
2019 FIBA Basketball World Cup players
Basketball players at the 2012 Summer Olympics
Basketball players at the 2016 Summer Olympics
Basketball players at the 2020 Summer Olympics
Bàsquet Manresa players
Denver Nuggets draft picks
FIBA EuroBasket-winning players
Liga ACB players
Medalists at the 2012 Summer Olympics
Medalists at the 2016 Summer Olympics
Olympic basketball players of Spain
Olympic bronze medalists for Spain
Olympic medalists in basketball
Olympic silver medalists for Spain
People from Mahón
Point guards
Real Madrid Baloncesto players
Shooting guards
Spanish men's basketball players
Sportspeople from Menorca
FIBA Basketball World Cup-winning players